Sakoana is a town and commune in Madagascar. It belongs to the district of Manakara, which is a part of Vatovavy-Fitovinany Region. The population of the commune was estimated to be approximately 13,000 in 2001 commune census.

Only primary schooling is available. The majority 97.3% of the population of the commune are farmers.  The most important crops are cassava and rice, while lychee is also important. Industry and services provide employment for 0.2% and 2.5% of the population, respectively.

References and notes 

Populated places in Vatovavy-Fitovinany